The 2017 South Africa Women's Quadrangular Series was an international women's cricket tournament that was held in Potchefstroom, South Africa, from 4 to 21 May 2017. The series was contested between the teams of India, Ireland, South Africa and Zimbabwe. The matches were played at Senwes Park and The PUK Oval. All the matches were played as Women's One Day International (WODI) matches, except for fixtures that featured Zimbabwe, who do not have WODI status.

Ahead of the tournament, South Africa's captain Dane van Niekerk was ruled out of the tournament due to a foot injury. South Africa named an interim captain, but they did not add a replacement to their squad.

India won the tournament, beating South Africa by eight wickets in the final.

Squads

Points table

Fixtures

Warm-up matches

Round-robin stage

Finals

References

External links
 Series home at ESPN Cricinfo

2017 in women's cricket
International cricket competitions in 2017
Women's One Day International cricket competitions
May 2017 sports events in Africa
International women's cricket competitions in South Africa
2017 in South African cricket
2017 in South African women's sport
2017 in Irish cricket
2017 in Irish women's sport
2016–17 Indian women's cricket
2017 in Zimbabwean cricket